Myriocoleopsis is a genus of liverwort in family Lejeuneaceae.

Species
The following species are recognised in the genus Myriocoleopsis:
 Myriocoleopsis fluviatilis (Steph.) Reiner & Gradst.
 Myriocoleopsis gymnocolea (Spruce) M.E.Reiner & Gradst.
 Myriocoleopsis minutissima (Sm.) R.L.Zhu, Y.Yu & Pócs
 Myriocoleopsis vuquangensis (Pócs & Ninh) Pócs

References 

Porellales genera
Lejeuneaceae
Taxonomy articles created by Polbot